The Cégep de Rivière-du-Loup is a college-level educational institution established in 1969 in Rivière-du-Loup, Quebec, Canada.

The institution offers 21 programs, including nursing, Emergency Medical Services and Early Childhood Education. Approximately  students enroll every year: 30% in the pre-university program, and 70% in the technical program. The college also offers continuing education courses for approximately  people in the Grand-Portage, Quebec region each year.

At this time, approximately  people have graduated from the Cégep de Rivière-du-Loup.

Programs of study

Pre-university programs 
Social sciences and humanities
Natural sciences
Culture and communication (Liberal arts)
Visual arts

Technical programs 
Nursing
Emergency medical services
Industrial electronics
Early childhood education
Recreational activities coordinator
Administration (accounting and management)
Web development
Interior design
Graphic design

Campus facilities 
Student residence
Located in the main wing, the residence consists of 211 single and double rooms, some of which are wheelchair accessible.
Each room is equipped with an Internet connection, cable TV connection, a telephone, a sink and basic furnishings (bed, dresser, desk). Fridge rentals are available. The front desk is open 24 hours a day, and security staff are on site 24 hours a day. There is also a residence life advisor.
Residents have access to common areas such as a TV lounge, game room, laundry room, kitchens, storage space, mailboxes, and bike storage.
9 ½ month leases are available.
Cultural centre: a performance hall with close to  seats
Eight-lane semi-Olympic sized swimming pool
Athletic centre that includes gymnasiums, a fitness centre with weightlifting and cardio equipment, and  rooms for dance classes, combat sports and racquetball
Student café called "Le Carrefour"
Library with audiovisual materials and a computer lab
Centre for borrowing photographic and audiovisual equipment
Childcare centre
Coopsco for buying books and school supplies
Art supply store offering student rates

Related articles 
CEGEP
Rivière-du-Loup

External links 
Cégep de Rivière-du-Loup official website (in French)

Government colleges in Quebec
Educational institutions established in 1969
Quebec CEGEP
Education in Bas-Saint-Laurent
Buildings and structures in Bas-Saint-Laurent
Rivière-du-Loup
1969 establishments in Quebec